Batman (also Romanized as Bātmān) is a village in Razavar Rural District, in the Central District of Kermanshah County, Kermanshah Province, Iran.

Geography 
The centre of Batman is located at a latitude of 34.7508 and longitude of 46.9542. The village has an elevation of 1481 meters above sea level.

Culture 
The major languages spoken in this area are— Avestan, Persian and Kurdish.

Demographics 
At the 2006 census, its population was 450, in 117 families.

References 

Populated places in Kermanshah County